Pradeep Rimal (1937–2015) was a Nepalese film director, lyricist, screenwriter and cultural anthropologist. He is best known for directing Silu, the first Newar language film. In 1971, he won the Madan Puraskar for Karnali Lok Sanskriti. He wrote lyrics for many songs among which 'Kasturi Ho Baas Aauncha Bhanchhan' and 'Yo Barsa Chhodi Malai...' were sung by Narayan Gopal.

Biography 
Rimal was born in 1937 (15 Ashoj 1994 BS) in Lubhu village of Lalitpur District of Nepal to father Durga Parsad Rimal and mother Dilli Kumari Rimal. 

In 1996, he worked as an assistant director and musician for Maitighar.

He wrote the culture, music and arts related volume of the five–part Karnali Lok Sanskriti. He received the Madan Puraskar for this work alongside Chudamani Bandhu, Bihari Krishna Shrestha, Sthirjunga Bahadur Singh and Satya Mohan Joshi in 1971.

In 1985, he directed Ke Ghar Ke Dera, which featured Maha Jodi. In 1987, he directed the first ever Newar language film titled Silu . 

He also wrote lyrics for many songs and directed multiple music videos and infomercials. 

He died on 7 February 2015 in Virginia state of United States.

Notable works

Book 

 Karnali Lok Sanskriti (1971)

Films

References 

1937 births
2015 deaths
20th-century Nepalese musicians
20th-century Nepalese film directors
20th-century Nepalese male writers
Madan Puraskar winners
People from Lalitpur District, Nepal